The Diocese of Leoben was an Austrian Roman Catholic diocese which covered parts of Styria formerly in the Archdiocese of Salzburg. It was founded on 28 January 1785 but after the death in 1800 of the first and only Bishop, its incorporation into the Diocese of Seckau was ordered in 1804 by Emperor Francis II. Although the Bishops of Seckau administered it from 1808, however, Papal consent to the unification was not given until 1859.

History 
The Diocese of Leoben was created at the wish of Emperor Joseph II from territory belonging to the Archdiocese of Salzburg. Pope Pius VI gave his consent to its creation on 17 March 1786.

The first and only Bishop of Leoben was Alexander Franz Joseph Graf Engl von und zu Wagrain, appointed on 20 Nov 1783 and ordained bishop on 30 Apr 1786. The episcopal seat was in the church of the former Göss Abbey near Leoben, which Joseph II had dissolved, and where a cathedral chapter was also set up.

The diocesan territory comprised the districts of Bruck an der Mur and Judenburg together with the area round Aussee, and contained 157 parishes.

After the death of Bishop Count Engl on 22 February 1800 the diocese was administered until 1808 by the chapter, and thereafter by the bishops of Seckau.

As early as 13 July 1804, the unification of the Diocese of Leoben with the Roman Catholic Diocese of Seckau was ordered by Habsburg Emperor Franz II. The papacy delayed its ratification however, and the unification did not actually take place until 1 September 1859.

References

Literature 
 Tomek, Ernst, 1935-39: Kirchengeschichte Österreichs. Innsbruck-Vienna-Munich: Tyrolia
 Wodka, Josef, 1959: Kirche in Österreich. Wegweiser durch ihre Geschichte. Vienna: Herder

External links 
 History of the Diocese of Graz-Seckau 
 AEIOU: Göss Abbey 
 Catholic Hierarchy: Diocese of Leoben

Styria
Leoben

Roman Catholic dioceses and prelatures established in the 18th century
Religious organizations established in 1786
Establishments in the Duchy of Styria